Spectral Display is a Dutch new wave group formed by Amsterdam-based synthesizer player Michel Mulders. The group achieved success in 1982 with the single "It Takes a Muscle to Fall in Love", released in 13 countries. and also covered by M.I.A. in 2010 and Kirin J. Callinan in 2019. The group returned after a lengthy hiatus with the announcement of their 2020 album You Steal My Heart, with new member Paul Simon.

Discography

Albums 
 Spectral Display (1982), EMI
 Too Much Like Me (1984), EMI
 You Steal My Heart (2020), Spectral-Records

Singles 
 "It Takes a Muscle to Fall in Love" (1982), EMI (featuring Henri Overduin)
 "There a Virus Going Round" (1982), EMI
 "Electric Circus" (1982), EMI
 "Danceable" (1984), EMI
 "Legendary" (1984), EMI
 "Too Much Like Me" (1984), EMI
 "It Takes a Muscle to Fall in Love (Remix)" (2019), Spectral-Records
 "It Takes a Muscle (Reggae)" (2019), Spectral-Records
"To Me You're Everything" (2021), Spectral-Records
"You're My Religion" (2021), Spectral-Records

References

External links 
 
 
 

Musical groups from Amsterdam
Dutch new wave musical groups
Musical groups established in 1982
EMI Group artists
1982 establishments in the Netherlands